Himanshu Rana (born 1 October 1998) is an Indian cricketer who plays for Haryana in domestic cricket. He is a right-handed batsman and occasional right-arm medium pace bowler.

Rana made his first-class debut against delhi  in January 2015 at the age of 16 and top-scored for Haryana with 80 in that match. In his third match of the season, he hit his maiden century of 149 against Rajasthan giving his team an innings win. In the first match of the 2015–16 Ranji Trophy against Maharashtra in October 2015, he scored a career-best 157. He made his List A debut for Haryana in the 2016–17 Vijay Hazare Trophy on 25 February 2017.

In December 2017, he was named in India's squad for the 2018 Under-19 Cricket World Cup.

He was the leading run-scorer for Haryana in the 2018–19 Ranji Trophy, with 594 runs in nine matches.

References

External links
 
 

1998 births
Living people
Indian cricketers
Haryana cricketers
People from Sonipat
Cricketers from Haryana